Sir Wallace Alexander Ramsay Rae (31 March 1913 – 18 March 2006) was a member of the Queensland Legislative Assembly in Australia. He served in various Queensland Government ministries.

Biography 
Rae worked as a stock and station agent before serving as a bomber pilot in World War II. After the war, he bought a property located between Blackall and Isisford.

A member of the Country Party he was elected to the Queensland Legislative Assembly representing the electorate of Gregory in 1957. During his long career in Parliament, he held several ministerial positions including Minister for Local Government and Electricity and Minister for Lands and Forestry.  He was later appointed Queensland's Agent-General in London.

In the 1976 Queen's Birthday Honours, he was made a knight bachelor.

He died in Port Macquarie, New South Wales, on 18 March 2006.

References

Further reading
 

1913 births
2006 deaths
Members of the Queensland Legislative Assembly
Australian Knights Bachelor
National Party of Australia members of the Parliament of Queensland
20th-century Australian politicians
Australian World War II bomber pilots
Australian stock and station agents